is an area in Nishi-Ikebukuro 2-chōme and 3-chōme, Toshima, Tokyo, Japan, mainly along Seibu Ikebukuro Line. This term is commonly used, but has never been used as an official district name.

The etymology of Agariyashiki is considered to be the historical fact that its southern area, today officially known as Mejiro, Toshima and Shimo-Ochiai, Shinjuku, was a hunting zone owned by Tokugawa clan and its shōguns came to the present-day Agariyashiki area as a resting place.

Today, the term Agariyashiki is recognized by Toshima Ward Agariyashiki Park and the Agariyashiki town council. There used to be Agariyashiki Station, owned by Seibu Ikebukuro Line, but the station became defunct in 1953.

Neighborhoods of Tokyo
Toshima